The Asian Women's U23 Volleyball Championship is an international volleyball competition in Asia and Oceania contested by the under 23 Women's national teams of the members of Asian Volleyball Confederation (AVC), the sport's continent governing body. The first championship was held in Pasig, Philippines, in 2015.

The current champion is China, which won the second title at the 2019 tournament. The         tournament have been won by two national teams: China with two titles and Japan with one title.

The 2019 Championship took place in Hà Nội, Vietnam, from 13 to 21 July. The 2021 Championship was cancelled due to COVID-19 pandemic.

Results summary

Teams reaching the top four

Champions by region

Hosts

Medal summary

Participating nations

Debut of teams

Awards

See also

 Asian Men's U23 Volleyball Championship
 Asian Women's Volleyball Championship
 Asian Women's U19 Volleyball Championship
 Asian Girls' U18 Volleyball Championship

External links
 Official AVC website

U23

V
International volleyball competitions
International women's volleyball competitions
Youth volleyball
Volleyball competitions in Asia
Biennial sporting events
Asian Volleyball Confederation competitions
Asian youth sports competitions
2015 establishments in Asia